Glycineamide ribonucleotide (or GAR) is a biochemical intermediate in the formation of purine nucleotides via inosine-5-monophosphate, and hence is a building block for DNA and RNA. The vitamins thiamine and cobalamin also contain fragments derived from GAR.

GAR is the product of the enzyme phosphoribosylamine—glycine ligase acting on phosphoribosylamine (PRA) to combine it with glycine in a process driven by ATP. The reaction,  forms an amide bond:
  +  + ATP →  + ADP + Pi

The biosynthesis pathway next adds a formyl group from 10-formyltetrahydrofolate to GAR, catalysed by phosphoribosylglycinamide formyltransferase in reaction  and producing formylglycinamide ribotide (FGAR):
GAR + 10-formyltetrahydrofolate → FGAR + tetrahydrofolate

See also
 5-Aminoimidazole ribotide
 Purine metabolism

References

Nucleotides